

Walter Anderson  (27 July 1890 – 11 May 1959) was a recipient of the George Cross and an officer in the Royal Air Force (RAF).

Life
Anderson was born in County Cork on 27 July 1890. He entered the Royal Navy in 1906 as a Boy 2nd Class and in 1916 transferred to the Royal Naval Air Service. He then joined the RAF, where by 1920 he was a Technical Officer. After service in India and Iraq, he returned to the UK as an Armament Officer at a Flying Training School in Kent. He retired from the RAF in 1932, and died on 11 May 1959 at Hythe, Hampshire.

Medal action
On 10 December 1928, Pilot Officer, later Air Chief Marshall Sir, Hugh Constantine, while flying a Siskin fighter aircraft off Leysdown on the Isle of Sheppey in Kent, crashed into the sea, about 200 yards from the shore. In cold and rough conditions, Corporal Thomas McTeague and Flying Officer Anderson swam from the shore to Constantine who was in a state of collapse. Through their combined efforts McTeague and Anderson were able to bring Constantine back to the land.

Both Anderson and McTeague were awarded the Empire Gallantry Medal, converted into the George Cross when that award was instituted in 1940. In 1942, accompanied by McTeague, Anderson attended an investiture at Buckingham Palace for the George Cross.

Citation

References

External links
Biography of Walter Anderson, VConline.org.uk

1890 births
1959 deaths
Recipients of the Empire Gallantry Medal
British recipients of the George Cross
Royal Air Force officers
People from County Cork